Princess Iman bint Abdullah (born 27 September 1996) is a Jordanian princess and the first daughter and the second child of King Abdullah II and Queen Rania of Jordan.

Early life 
Born in Amman on 27 September 1996 at King Hussein Medical Center in Amman, she is the second child of King Abdullah II and Queen Rania. She has two brothers and one sister. Princess Iman is a member of the Hashemite family. Her paternal grandfather was the then-reigning King Hussein and her grandmother is the English-born Princess Muna, who was his second wife. Iman has one elder brother, Crown Prince Hussein, and two younger siblings, Princess Salma and Prince Hashem.

Titles
Iman is a Jordanian princess with the official style and title "Her Royal Highness The Princess Iman of Jordan". At the time of her birth, she used the title "Her Serene Highness", but when she turned one year old she began to use her official style and title.

Personal life
On 6 July 2022, the Royal Hashemite Court announced the engagement of Princess Iman to Jameel Alexander "Jimmy" Thermiótis (born on 28 April 1994 in Caracas, Venezuela). He cofounded Outbound Ventures, a technology investment firm in New York City. The couple were married on 12 March 2023 at Beit Al Urdun Palace. Princess Iman wore a Dior gown, lace veil and diamond tiara.

References

Living people
1996 births
House of Hashim
Jordanian people of English descent
Jordanian people of Palestinian descent
Jordanian princesses
People from Amman
Daughters of kings